Execution by shooting is a method of capital punishment in which a person is shot to death by one or more firearms. It is the most common method of execution worldwide, used in about 70 countries, with execution by firing squad being one particular form.

In most countries, execution by a firing squad has historically been considered a more honorable death and was used primarily for military personnel, though in some countries—among them Belarus, the only state in Europe today that has the death penalty—the single executioner shooting inherited from the Soviet past is still in use.

Brazil

Although Brazil abolished capital punishment in peacetime, it can be used for certain crimes in a period of war, such as betrayal, conspiracy, mutiny, unauthorised retreat in battles, and theft of equipment or supplies in a military base. The execution method in this case is execution by shooting.

Europe

In Belarus, executions are performed by a single executioner shooting condemned through the brain from behind with a suppressed pistol.

Soviet bloc 

In 20th-century communist states, shooting was a standard form of execution of civilian and military prisoners alike, with the Soviet Union setting an example of the single-executioner approach. The firing squad, with its solemn and lengthy ceremony was used infrequently.
 
The most common method was the firing of a pistol bullet ("nine grams of lead") into the brain.

This method was widely used during the Great Purges of the late 1930s at locations outside the major cities, e.g. Krasny Bor near Petrozavodsk, against purportedly anti-social elements, "counter-revolutionaries" and other enemies of the people.

It was also used in the execution of those who had committed ordinary criminal offences. Even after the breakup of the Soviet Union, people continued to be executed by shooting. Serial killer Andrei Chikatilo was executed in this way in 1994, just before Russia discontinued capital punishment as part of its accession to the Council of Europe.

United Kingdom

No British citizen has ever been executed for a civilian crime by shooting by the British Crown Judiciary. A Royal Commission on Capital Punishment considered shooting as a possible alternative to hanging, although the findings published in 1953 concluded shooting was not a sufficiently effective means of execution to justify a switch to the method from hanging.

United States
Since 1608, about 142 men have been judicially shot in the United States and its English-speaking predecessor territories, excluding executions related to the American Civil War.

Asia

Bahrain uses firing squads for execution.
In China, shooting as a method of execution takes two typical formats, either a pistol shot in the back of the head or neck or a shot by a rifle in either the back or the back of the head from behind. Some more recent executions have been private and carried out using lethal injection, though shooting is still more frequently used. Hong Kong abolished the death penalty and Macau never had the death penalty prior to the handover, and neither restored it when they returned to Chinese sovereignty.
In India, during the Mughal rule, soldiers who committed crimes were executed by being strapped to a cannon which was then fired. This was known as blowing from a gun. This method, invented by the Mughals, was continued by the British who used it to execute native deserters and mutineers, especially after the Sepoy Mutiny of 1857.  It is no longer practiced in the Republic of India, having been replaced by long drop hanging.
In Indonesia, capital punishment is administered by a firing squad which aims for the heart. 
In Mongolia, the method of execution before abolition in 2012 was a bullet to the neck from a .38 caliber revolver, a method inherited from Soviet legislation. (See Capital punishment in Mongolia.)
Executions by shooting have occurred in Myanmar.
In North Korea, executions are carried out by firing squad in public, making North Korea one of four countries that continue performing public executions.
Oman uses firing squads for execution.
In Taiwan, the customary method is a single shot aimed at the heart (or at the brain stem, if the prisoner consents to organ donation). Before the execution, the prisoner is injected with a strong anesthetic to leave them completely senseless (see capital punishment in Taiwan).
In Thailand from 1934 until 2003, a single executioner would shoot the convict in the back from a mounted machine gun. In 1979, a Thai woman named Ginggaew Lorsoungnern was executed only to wake up and walk. She was then shot a second time. Executions are now done by lethal injection.
Shooting is the primary method of execution in the United Arab Emirates.
Shooting is the primary method of execution in Yemen.
Shooting is used in Saudi Arabia, but beheadings are more common.
Before 2011, Vietnam used firing squad for execution. Since 2011, Vietnam has used lethal injection as the main form of death penalty.

See also 

 Bullet fee
 Execution by firing squad
 Execution-style murder
 Use of capital punishment by nation

References

Citations

Sources 

 Zelitch, Judah. "Soviet Administration of Criminal Law". University of Pennsylvania Press, 1931.

External links 
 Method of Execution: A Stark Tradition The New York Times, September 30, 2006

Shooting
Firearms